Amphionthophagus is a subgenus of Scarabaeidae or scarab beetles in the superfamily Scarabaeoidea. It is in the genus Onthophagus.

References

Scarabaeidae